William Davis Shields (August 19, 1907 – March 28, 1989) was a Vice Admiral in the United States Coast Guard who served as the 9th Vice Commandant from 1964 to 1966.

References

United States Coast Guard admirals
1907 births
1989 deaths
Vice Commandants of the United States Coast Guard